Harry Thomas Lemmon (born December 11, 1930) was a justice of the Louisiana Supreme Court from May 16, 1980 to May 16, 2001.

Born in Morgan City, Louisiana, Lemmon graduated from Morgan City High School in 1948, and from the University of Southwestern Louisiana in 1952. After briefly working as a chemist for American Oil Company, he served in the United States Army Chemical Corps in the Korean War. He graduated from Loyola University New Orleans College of Law in 1963, and was in private practice from then until 1970.

Lemmon became a judge of the Louisiana Fourth Circuit Court of Appeal in 1970, serving in that capacity until his election to the state supreme court in 1980 to serve out the unexpired term of Justice Frank W. Summers, following the latter's elevation to chief justice. Lemmon declined to run for another full term on the court because he would be forced to retire upon meeting the mandatory retirement age just a few years into such a new term. In addition to his judicial service, Lemmon co-authored the Louisiana Civil Law Treatise on Civil Procedure.

Lemmon married Mary Ann Vial, an attorney who later became a United States District Judge, with whom he had six children.

References

1930 births
Living people
People from Morgan City, Louisiana
University of Louisiana at Lafayette alumni
Loyola University New Orleans College of Law alumni
Justices of the Louisiana Supreme Court